Surprises! is an Australian pre-school children's television series which first aired on the Nine Network on 14 October 2012. It then aired on the network's 9GO! channel.

It was produced by Ambience Entertainment and was a spin-off series from William & Sparkles' Magical Tales, another show now airs on 9GO!

Surprises! is set in a stylised travelling space contraption where William the Wizard and Sparkles the Fairy are joined by their speedy courier friend, Digby Dash. Together the team lead a group of pre-schoolers on a thrilling journey as each new episode uncovers a daily surprise.

References

Nine Network original programming
9Go! original programming
Australian children's television series
2012 Australian television series debuts
2014 Australian television series endings